Monona Township is a township in Clayton County, Iowa, USA.  As of the 2000 census, its population was 2,225.

Geography
According to the USGS, it contains six cemeteries: Luana, Luana Lutheran, Monona, Pioneer, Saint Patricks and Saint Pauls Lutheran.

References
 USGS Geographic Names Information System (GNIS)

External links
 US-Counties.com
 City-Data.com

Townships in Clayton County, Iowa
Townships in Iowa